Bashneft – Novoil   is one of the biggest producers of high-quality petroleum products in Russia.

The current production facilities of Bashneft – Novoil include primary oil refining, hydrotreatment, reforming and iso-reforming, sulphuric acid alkylation, thermocracking and visbreaking, coking and gas fractionation, solvent refining and dewaxing of oil distillates, tar deasphalting and bitumen production, gas desulphurization and sulphur production units as well as environmental facilities.

The flexible technological schemes refine various types of hydrocarbons — low- and high-sulphur crude oil, various gas condensates as well as medium and heavy distillates obtained at other refineries of Ufa Group — and produce a wide range of high-quality petroleum products.
 
In 2011, the refinery continued to produce Euro-3 and Euro-4 engine fuels. It is planned to start producing Euro-5 fuel in the near future.

From 1956 to 1990 he worked at the plant 1st President of Bashkortostan Murtaza Rakhimov.

References

External links

 
 Official website in Russian

Petroleum industry in Russia
Companies based in Ufa
Oil refineries in the Soviet Union